
Gmina Słubice is an urban-rural gmina (administrative district) in Słubice County, Lubusz Voivodeship, in western Poland, on the German border.

Villages
Apart from the town of Słubice, Gmina Słubice contains the villages and settlements of Drzecin, Golice, Kunice, Kunowice, Łazy Lubuskie, Lisów, Nowe Biskupice, Nowy Lubusz, Pławidło, Rybocice, Stare Biskupice and Świecko.

Neighbouring gminas
Gmina Słubice is bordered by the gminas of Cybinka, Górzyca and Rzepin. It also borders Germany.

Twin towns – sister cities

Gmina Słubice is twinned with:

 Elektrėnai, Lithuania (2010)
 Frankfurt (Oder), Germany (1975)
 Heilbronn, Germany (1998)
 Shostka, Ukraine (2008)
 Tijuana, Mexico (1998)
 Yuma, United States (2000)

References

Slubice
Słubice County